Janet Aitken may refer to:
 Janet Aitken (physician) (1886–1982), British physician
 Janet Aitken (artist) (1873–1941), Scottish painter
 Janet Gladys Aitken (1908–1988), Canadian-British aristocrat and socialite